Rishi Kumar Behl (born 15 May 1951) is an Indian scientist, professor, and author.

He is former director, Universal Institute of Technology, Hansi, Hisar, Associate Dean in College of Agriculture, Chaudhary Charan Singh Haryana Agricultural University. He is General Secretary of International Foundation for Sustainable Development in Africa and Asia, Germany. He is presently working in Jagan Nath University, NCR as a Dean of Faculty of Sciences.

Education and career
BSc (Agri, 1972) from Rajasthan University, Jaipur, MSc (Agri, Plant Breeding, 1974) and PhD (Genetics, 1980) from Haryana Agriculture, university, Hisar, India. He received advance training in Plant Breeding at University of Goettingen, Germany between 1982 and 1984. He served CCS Haryana Agricultural University, Hisar between 1978 and 2011 Department of Genetics and Plant Breeding and then as Associate Dean, College of Agriculture. He has worked as Director, New Initiatives at Manav Institute, Jevra in Hisar.

Activities
He is founder secretary and now president of International Council of Sustainable Agriculture (ICSA). He is founder Member Secretary of SSARM (Society for Sustainable Agriculture and Resource Management), India.

He participated in and organized several international conferences in India and abroad.

He has been also member of various editorial boards, including editor in chief of Annals of Biology for about three decades, associate editor of Annals of Agri Bio Research, editorial board member of Archives of Agronomy and Soil Science Germany, international advisory board member of Tropics Japan, associate editor, Cereal Research Communication Hungary, associate editor, South Pacific Journal of Natural Science Fiji, senior editor, Journal of Basic Microbiology, Germany, and has about 200 publications in international and national journals and 30 edited books and manuals to his credit.

He is editor of various books and manuals. A few books are as under-
 Vistas in Computer Aided Agri-Bio-Engineering Technologies

 Biotechnology and Plant Breeding Perspectives
 Crop Science and Technology for Food , Bioenergy and Sustainability
 Crop Science and Land Use for Food and Bioenergy
 Resource Management Towards Sustainable Agriculture and Development
 
 .
 
 .
 .
 .
 .
 .
 .
 
 .

References 

1951 births
20th-century Indian scientists
Living people